The national nature reserves (NNRs) of Scotland are areas of land or water designated under the Wildlife and Countryside Act 1981 as containing habitats and species of national importance. National nature reserves can be owned by public, private, community or voluntary organisations but must be managed to conserve their important habitats and species, as well as providing opportunities for the public to enjoy and engage with nature. There are currently 43 NNRs in Scotland, which cover , or less than 1.5% of the land area of Scotland. They range in size from Corrieshalloch Gorge at 7 ha to Mar Lodge Estate, which covers 29,324 ha.

National nature reserve status is an accolade awarded to the best nature reserves in Scotland, and the selected sites provide examples of nationally or internationally important species and habitats. NNRs are intended to showcase Scotland's nature, and as well as being well managed for wildlife they must be managed to provide opportunities for the public to visit and enjoy them. NNRs therefore generally have facilities such as visitor centres and trails to allow visitors to explore and understand the habitats or wildlife they contain.

Most NNRs in Scotland are also designated as Sites of Special Scientific Interest. Many also form part of the Natura 2000 network, which covers Special Protection Areas and Special Areas of Conservation. Additionally, some of the NNRs are designated as Ramsar sites.

History
National nature reserves were first created under the National Parks and Access to the Countryside Act 1949. In 1996 the public body responsible for Scotland's natural heritage, Scottish Natural Heritage (SNH – since renamed NatureScot), undertook a review of NNR policy that took account of the availability of other designations conferring legal protection, such as site of special scientific interest, special protection area and special area of conservation. It was determined that NNR should possess four attributes:
Primacy of nature – conservation must be the primary land use within a NNR: "nature comes first".
National importance – the conservation value of the habitat, species or feature must be such that it is of national importance that the site be managed as a reserve.
Best practice management – NNRs must be well managed.
Continuity of management – a long-term view is required.
Additionally, it was determined that NNRs should be managed for at least one of three purposes:
Raising public awareness.
Specialised and pro-active management.
Offering opportunities for research into the ecology and its management.

Between 2000 and 2003 the existing NNRs were reviewed against these criteria. Prior to 2004 there were 73 national nature reserves in Scotland, however a number have since been de-designated. New NNRs have also been designated, such as the National Trust for Scotland's Glen Coe and Mar Lodge properties, which were both designated NNRs in 2017.

Since 2012 governance of the NNR designation in Scotland has been through a partnership group, comprising representatives of existing reserve management organisations and community land groups, chaired by NatureScot. NatureScot remains responsible for the statutory declaration of national nature reserves.

Maintenance and management
 
NatureScot is responsible for designating NNRs in Scotland and for overseeing the maintenance and management of each reserve. The majority of NNRs are directly managed by NatureScot; however, some are managed by, or in co-operation with other bodies.  The NNR partnership consists of nine bodies:

 Community Land Scotland
 Forestry and Land Scotland (FLS)
 National Trust for Scotland (NTS)
 RSPB Scotland
 Scottish Land and Estates
 NatureScot
 Scottish Wildlife Trust (SWT)
 South Lanarkshire Council
 Woodland Trust Scotland

Details on the management of each reserve are shown in the table below.

List of national nature reserves in Scotland

Former NNRs, de-declared since 2004

 Braehead Moss, de-declared on 9 December 2011
 Ben Lui, de-declared on 18 May 2018
 Caenlochan, de-declared in 2005, although Corrie Fee remains a national nature reserve
 Claish Moss, de-declared on 1 March 2012
 Cragbank Woods, de-declared on 20 December 2012
 Den of Airlie, de-declared on 20 December 2012
 Eilean Na Muice Duibhe, Islay
 Glencripesdale, de-declared on 1 March 2012
 Inchnadamph, delisted as a national nature reserve in 2009
 Inverpolly, de-declared in 2004, although Knockan Crag remains a national nature reserve
 Keen of Hamar, de-declared on 13 July 2012
 Kirkconnell Flow, de-declared on 18 May 2018
 Loch a' Mhuilinn
 Loch Druidibeg, de-declared on 1 March 2012
 Mealdarroch, de-declared on 9 December 2011
 Monach Islands, de-declared on 18 May 2018
 Morrone Birkwood
 Morton Lochs, now part of Tentsmuir NNR
 Nigg and Udale Bays, de-declared on 9 December 2011
 Rannoch Moor, de-declared on 1 March 2012
 Rassal Ashwood, de-declared on 31 March 2014
 Rona and Sula Sgeir, de-declared on 18 May 2018
 Silver Flowe, de-declared on 18 May 2018
 Tynron Juniper Wood
 Whitlaw Mosses, de-declared on 18 May 2018

See also
National nature reserve (United Kingdom)
National nature reserves in England
National nature reserves in Wales
Nature reserves in Northern Ireland

References

External links
 Scotland's National Nature Reserves – Official Site
 Interactive map of designations in Scotland, including National Nature Reserves boundaries (select 'Nature Reserves' in UK Map Layers).

Lists of protected areas of Scotland